Thomas Beckett may refer to:

 Thomas W. Naylor Beckett (1839–1906), English-born planter, botanist and bryologist
 Tom Beckett (born 1962), British Army lieutenant-general
 Thomas Beckett (Sniper), the main protagonist in the Sniper series

See also
 Thomas Becket (1119–1170), Archbishop of Canterbury